Lake Toxaway Methodist Church, also known as Methodist Episcopal Church South, is a historic Methodist church on Cold Mountain Road on the north side, 0.1 miles norwest of the junction with NC 281 in Lake Toxaway, Transylvania County, North Carolina. It was built in 1912, and is a small one-story, Late Gothic Revival style frame structure.  It has a six-sided louvered bell tower and a tin roof.

It was added to the National Register of Historic Places in 1994.

References

Methodist churches in North Carolina
Churches on the National Register of Historic Places in North Carolina
Gothic Revival church buildings in North Carolina
Churches completed in 1912
20th-century Methodist church buildings in the United States
Buildings and structures in Transylvania County, North Carolina
National Register of Historic Places in Transylvania County, North Carolina
1912 establishments in North Carolina